Troyer is a last name of German origin which is widespread among the Amish, Brethren and the Mennonites. It is the Pennsylvania German form of the German last name "Dreier", "Dreyer", "Treyer" or "Dreher". A Dreher in German is a traditional operator of a rotating cutting machine. 

Hans Treyer, an early Anabaptist leader, died as a martyr of his faith in Bern in 1529. Beginning at around 1733, some Treyers (now Troyer) moved from Europe to Pennsylvania, settling in Berks County. 

Troyer  is the last name of:

Baracuda (rapper) (born Graham Troyer, 1983), Canadian hip hop artist
Braeden Troyer (born 1993), American soccer player
Carlos Troyer (1837–1920), German-born American musician and composer of traditional Native American melodies
Eric Troyer (born 1949), American singer-songwriter and keyboardist
Ferdinand Troyer (1780–1851), Austrian noble, philanthropist, and amateur clarinettist
John Troyer (1753–1842), Canadian-born American farmer, businessman, medical practitioner, and exorcist
John Troyer (fighter) (born 1985), American mixed martial artist
Maynard Troyer (1938–2018), American race car driver
Noah Troyer (1831–1886), American Amish Mennonite "sleeping preacher"
Robert Troyer (born 1960), American attorney and politician
Verne Troyer (1969–2018), American actor, comedian, and stunt performer
Warner Troyer (1932–1991), Canadian broadcast journalist and writer

See also
De Troyer (disambiguation), a similar surname
Hereditary spastic paraplegia, also known as Troyer syndrome
Troyer Amish, a subgroup of Old Order Amish

References

German-language surnames